Morocco is a member of the United Nations and belongs to the African Union, Arab League, Arab Maghreb Union (UMA), Organisation of Islamic Cooperation (OIC), the Non-Aligned Movement and the Community of Sahel-Saharan States (CEN_SAD). Morocco's relationships vary greatly between African, Arab, and Western states. Morocco has had strong ties with the West in order to gain economic and political benefits. France and Spain remain the primary trade partners, as well as the primary creditors and foreign investors in Morocco. From the total foreign investments in Morocco, the European Union invests approximately 73.5%, whereas, the Arab world invests only 19.3%. Many countries from the Persian Gulf and Maghreb regions are also getting more involved in large-scale development projects in Morocco.

Foreign relations have had a significant impact on economic and social development in Morocco. Certain evidence of foreign influence is through the many development projects, loans, investments, and free trade agreements that Morocco has with other countries. Some free trade agreements include the Euro-Mediterranean free trade area agreement with the European Union; the Greater Arab Free Trade Area with Egypt, Jordan, and Tunisia; as well as the US-Morocco Free Trade Agreement with the United States. An example of recent foreign influence is through loan agreements. Morocco signed three loan agreements with the French Development Agency (AFD) in 2009, totalling up to 155 million euros. These were for the purpose of reforming the education system, rural roads and rehabilitation, as well as infrastructure projects.

Factors influencing foreign relations

Role of political organization

Policies associated with foreign relations are determined by King Mohamed VI, as well as his advisors, despite the fact that Morocco has a constitutional monarchy. Morocco has had a history of monarchical rule. For example, the previous king, Hassan II of Morocco, suspended parliament in 1965 and ruled directly for two years. This was in response to the discovery of a plot on the king's life, of which a political party, UNFP, was accused of orchestrating. Foreign relations with Western countries became strained as a result of this. Portraying Morocco as a democratic state became important if Morocco wished to receive loans and investments from foreign powers.

Role of colonialism

Morocco's current relations with some countries are related to its colonial history. Morocco was secretly partitioned by Spain and France and in 1912 the Moroccan territory was made into French and Spanish protectorates. After achieving independence in 1956, Morocco still has a strong relationship with its former colonizers. Spain and France are currently the largest exporting and importing partners to Morocco. French is still popularly spoken and remains the second language in Morocco whilst Spanish is also widespread, particularly in the northern regions. France now is home to more than a million Moroccans legally residing in the country. This is the largest Moroccan population in a foreign country, followed next by Spain. These former colonizers remain influential in economic matters, such as development projects, investments, trade, and loans.

Role of free market

Relations with foreign powers, especially with the West, have also been strengthened as Morocco has liberalized its economy and implemented major economic reforms. In 1993 there was major privatization and markets were opened up to foreign powers. Morocco now is focusing more on promoting foreign direct investments. In 2007, Morocco adopted the Hassan II Fund for Development, which are measures that simplify procedures to make the process easier and more financially beneficial for foreign investors. This was done with financial incentives, as well as tax exemptions. These policies make it beneficial for other countries to have relations with Morocco so that they can take advantage of their goods. Morocco's exports are mainly agriculture, and it is one of the largest exporters of phosphate in the world. In addition, Morocco has rich fishing waters, a tourist industry, and a small manufacturing sector.

Role of foreign policy support

Morocco also gains financial support from countries that it assists. For example, Morocco has had a long history of supporting the United States and it has received financial support as a result. Moroccan troops were involved in Bosnia as well as in Somalia, during the operation Desert Storm. Morocco also was among the first Arab and Islamic states to denounce the September 11 attacks and declare solidarity with the American people in the war against terror. It has contributed to UN peacekeeping efforts on the continent. In 1998, the U.S. Secretary of Defense, William Cohen, said that Morocco and the U.S. have "mutual concerns over transnational terrorism" as well as interests in "the effort to control the spread of weapons of mass destruction". In recognition of its support for the War on Terror, in June 2004 U.S. President George W. Bush designated Morocco as a major non-NATO ally. 
Another case of mutual foreign policy interests is with Saudi Arabia. Ties between these countries were strengthened when Morocco sent troops to help Saudi Arabia during the 1992 Gulf War. This was perceived as a "gesture to support Western and Arab allies". Morocco's relationship to countries in the Middle East and its contribution to the Palestinian cause have created stronger relations between these countries.

Role of immigration

Another factor determining relations is how much immigration the country receives from Morocco. The beginning of major migration to Europe began during the colonial era (1912 to 1956). During World War I and II, France had an urgent need for manpower, which led to the recruitment of tens of thousands of Moroccan men to work in factories, mines, and in the army. Another increase in immigration from Morocco to France was during the Algerian war of independence. France stopped recruiting workers from Algeria and instead accepted more Moroccan factory and mine labourers. Immigration increased even further from 1962 to 1972 when economic growth in Europe occurred, which led to a greater demand for low-skilled labour. At this time, Morocco signed major labour recruitment agreements with European countries, such as France, West Germany, Belgium, and the Netherlands. This led to a more diverse spread of emigration, which until this time was focused primarily on the country of France.

Morocco's perceived identity plays a role in its relations with other countries. Numerous countries have strong relations with Morocco because of its history of being a Western ally. For example, Morocco has the longest friendship treaties with the United States. This is important for US interests because Morocco is a stable, democratizing, and liberalizing MENA & Muslim nation. Geopolitical benefits are evident because ties to Morocco means that an ally is established in Africa, in the Maghreb region. Morocco's identity as a Muslim state has also strengthened ties with the Persian Gulf countries as a result of 9/11 and the "War on Terror". This has resulted in Arab countries, including members of the GCC (Saudi Arabia, Bahrain, Oman, Qatar, the United Arab Emirates), choosing to invest more in Morocco. Many countries in the Maghreb region also invest in Morocco because of perceived similarities in identity.

Maghreb and Africa

Morocco is very active in Maghreb and African affairs. The Arab Maghreb Union is made up of Morocco, Algeria, Libya, Mauritania, and Tunisia. Although it was long not a member of the African Union (formerly the Organisation of African Unity) since November 12, 1984—following the admission of the Sahrawi Arab Democratic Republic as the government of Western Sahara—Morocco remained involved in developing the regional economy, as the city of Casablanca contains North Africa's busiest port and serves as the country's economic center. Morocco rejoined the African Union on 30 January 2017, following a change in AU leadership. There are significant ties with West African and Sahel countries and Morocco maintains good relationships with Senegal, Gabon and Burkina Faso.

Positions on Western Sahara conflict

The following lists contain the following states and entities:
 45 states, the United Nations, the Non-Aligned Movement, the African Union and the European Union support "the right of self-determination of the people of Western Sahara" (e.g. the conduction of a referendum for status determination),
 65 states support Morocco's claim of Western Sahara, and 23 states have consulates and/or consulates-general in the Moroccan-administered Sahara.

Some states are listed in both lists, for example when a state is supportive of the "right of self-determination" including the option of autonomy under Morocco sovereignty. Some states change their opinion frequently, or give separate announcements of support for both Morocco and the Polisario Front/SADR.

Some of the states announcing support of the "right of self-determination" in addition already recognize the Sahrawi Arab Democratic Republic. Not all of the states that have canceled relations with or withdrawn recognition of SADR have announced support for the Moroccan claim.

Bilateral relations

Africa

Americas

Asia
Morocco's stance is supporting the search for peace in the Middle East, encouraging Israeli–Palestinian negotiations and urging moderation on both sides.

Morocco maintains close relations with Saudi Arabia and the Persian Gulf states, which have provided Morocco with substantial amounts of financial assistance. Morocco was the first Arab state to condemn Iraq's invasion of Kuwait and sent troops to help defend Saudi Arabia. Morocco also was among the first Arab and Islamic states to denounce the September 11 attacks in the United States and declare solidarity with the American people in the war against terrorism. It has contributed to United Nations peacekeeping efforts on the continent. In recognition of its support for the War on Terrorism, in June 2004 U.S. President George W. Bush designated Morocco as a major non-NATO ally.

Europe

Oceania

See also

 List of diplomatic missions in Morocco
 Ministry of Foreign Affairs, African Cooperation and Moroccan Expatriates (Morocco)

Notes

References

External links
The EU's Relations with Morocco
U.S. Dept. of State's Background Note on Morocco, Oct 2004
US Consulate a turning point for disputed Western Sahara (by MOSA'AB ELSHAMY, Associated Press, January 10, 2021)

Bibliography
Morocco Foreign Policy and Government Guide
"Analyzing Moroccan Foreign Policy and Relations with Europe" 

 
Government of Morocco